A hammock is a device used to sleep or rest in.

Hammock may also refer to:

 Hammock (band), an American post-rock group
 Hammock (ecology), a dense stand of trees
 Hammock Music, a record label
 Charles Hammock (1941–2014), American politician from Pennsylvania
 Cicero C. Hammock (1823–1890), American politician from Georgia
 Robby Hammock (born 1977), American Major League Baseball player
 Christina Hammock (born 1979), NASA astronaut

See also
 Hummock (disambiguation)